Frames per stop is a term used in the bowling industry by technicians, manufacturers, and others involved in this recreation industry.  The term refers to how many frames, on average, a group of pinsetters is able to operate without a stop, which is a malfunction or other condition which requires human assistance to fix the machine.

See also

References

ten-pin bowling